Dinner usually refers to what is in many Western cultures the largest and most formal meal of the day. Historically, the largest meal used to be eaten around midday, and called dinner. Especially among the elite, it gradually migrated to later in the day over the 16th to 19th centuries. The word has different meanings depending on culture, and may mean a meal of any size eaten at any time of day. In particular, it is still sometimes used for a meal at noon or in the early afternoon on special occasions, such as a Christmas dinner. In hot climates, the main meal is more likely to be eaten in the evening, after the temperature has fallen.

Etymology

The word is from the Old French , meaning "dine", from the stem of Gallo-Romance desjunare ("to break one's fast"), from Latin  (which indicates the opposite of an action) + Late Latin ieiunare ("to fast"), from Latin  ("fasting, hungry"). The Romanian word  and the French  retain this etymology and to some extent the meaning (whereas the Spanish word  and Portuguese  are related but are exclusively used for breakfast). Eventually, the term shifted to referring to the heavy main meal of the day, even if it had been preceded by a breakfast meal (or even both breakfast and lunch).

Time of day

Ancient
Reflecting the typical custom of the 17th century, Louis XIV dined at noon, and had supper at 10:00 pm. But in Europe, dinner began to move later in the day during the 1700s, due to developments in work practices, lighting, financial status, and cultural changes. The fashionable hour for dinner continued to be incrementally postponed during the 18th century, to two and three in the afternoon, and, in 1765, King George III dined at 4:00 pm, though his infant sons had theirs with their governess at 2:00 pm, leaving time to visit the queen as she dressed for dinner with the king. But in France Marie Antoinette, when still Dauphine of France in 1770, wrote that when at the Château de Choisy the court still dined at 2:00 pm, with a supper after the theatre at around 10:00 pm, before bed at 1:00 or 1:30 am.

At the time of the First French Empire an English traveler to Paris remarked upon the "abominable habit of dining as late as seven in the evening". By about 1850 English middle-class dinners were around 5:00 or 6:00 pm, allowing men to arrive back from work, but there was a continuing pressure for the hour to drift later, led by the elite who did not have to work set hours, and as commutes got longer as cities expanded. In the mid-19th century the issue was something of a social minefield, with a generational element. John Ruskin, once he married in 1848, dined at 6:00 pm, which his parents thought "unhealthy". Mrs Gaskell dined between 4:00 and 5:00 pm. The fictional Mr Pooter, a lower middle-class Londoner in 1888-89 and a diner at 5:00 pm, was invited by his son to dine at 8:00 pm, but "[he] said we did not pretend to be fashionable people, and would like the dinner earlier".

The satirical novel Living for Appearances (1855) by Henry Mayhew and his brother Augustus begins with the views of the hero on the matter. He dines at 7:00 pm, and often complains of "the disgusting and tradesman-like custom of early dining", say at 2:00 pm. The "Royal hour" he regards as 8:00 pm, but he does not aspire to that. He tells people "Tell me when you dine, and I will tell you what you are".

Modern

In many modern usages, the term dinner refers to the evening meal, which is now typically the largest meal of the day in most Western cultures. When this meaning is used, the preceding meals are usually referred to as breakfast, lunch and perhaps a tea. Supper is now often an alternative term for dinner; originally this was always a later secondary evening meal, after an early dinner.

The divide between different meanings of "dinner" is not cut-and-dried based on either geography or socioeconomic class. The term for the midday meal is most commonly used by working-class people, especially in the English Midlands, North of England and the central belt of Scotland. Even in systems in which dinner is the meal usually eaten at the end of the day, an individual dinner may still refer to a main or more sophisticated meal at any time in the day, such as a banquet, feast, or a special meal eaten on a Sunday or holiday, such as Christmas dinner or Thanksgiving dinner. At such a dinner, the people who dine together may be formally dressed and consume food with an array of utensils. These dinners are often divided into three or more courses. Appetizers consisting of options such as soup or salad, precede the main course, which is followed by the dessert.

A survey by Jacob's Creek, an Australian winemaker, found the average evening meal time in the U.K. to be 7:47pm.

Parties

A dinner party is a social gathering at which people congregate to eat dinner. Dinners exist on a spectrum, from a basic meal, to a state dinner.

Ancient Roman
During the times of Ancient Rome, a dinner party was referred to as a convivium, and was a significant event for Roman emperors and senators to congregate and discuss their relations.

English
In London (–), dinner parties were formal occasions that included printed invitations and formal RSVPs. The food served at these parties ranged from large, extravagant food displays and several meal courses to more simple fare and food service. Activities sometimes included singing and poetry reciting, among others.

Formal
A formal dinner has several requirements. First, it requires the participants to wear an evening attire such as a tuxedo, with either a black or white tie; second, all food is served from the kitchen; third, "neither serving dishes nor utensils are placed on the table. All service and table clearing is performed by butlers and other service staff;" fourth, multiple courses are served; and finally there is an order of service and seating protocols.

See also

 Early bird dinner
 Formal hall
 Snack
 Supper
 Tea

References

Bibliography

 
 
Flanders, Judith, The Victorian House: Domestic Life from Childbirth to Deathbed, 2003, Harper Perennial,  
 
Strong, Roy, Feast: A History of Grand Eating, 2002, Jonathan Cape,

Further reading

Gallery

External links

 "Dinner" definition  from Cambridge.org
 Wikibooks Cookbook
 BBC article on history of dinner

 
Meals